HMS Bideford was a member of the standardized 20-gun sixth rates built at the end of the 17th century. After commissioning she spent her short career in the West Indies, mainly employed as a trade protection vessel. She was wrecked in 1699.

Bideford (spelt Biddeford or Bideford) was the first named vessel in the Royal Navy.

Construction
She was ordered in the Second Batch of eight ships to be built under contract by Nicholas Barret of Harwich. She was launched on 25 October 1695.

Commissioned service
She was commissioned on 19 October 1695 under the command of Captain Thomas Thatcher, RN for service in the West Indies. Thatcher died on 20 October 1697. Captain Samuel Martin, RN took command on the 18th. In 1699 Captain Henry Searle was in command until he drowned in her wreck on 12 November 1699.

Loss
HMS Bideford was wrecked on the Isle of Ash off Hispaniola on 12 November 1699.

Notes

Citations

References
 Winfield, British Warships in the Age of Sail (1603 – 1714), by Rif Winfield, published by Seaforth Publishing, England © 2009, EPUB , Chapter 6, The Sixth Rates, Vessels acquired from 18 December 1688, Sixth Rates of 20 guns and up to 26 guns, Maidstone Group, Bideford
 Colledge, Ships of the Royal Navy, by J.J. Colledge, revised and updated by Lt Cdr Ben Warlow and Steve Bush, published by Seaforth Publishing, Barnsley, Great Britain, © 2020, e  (EPUB), Section B (Biddeford)

 

1690s ships
Corvettes of the Royal Navy
Naval ships of the United Kingdom